Huang Ho-hsiung is a road cyclist from Taiwan. She represented her nation as Chinese Taipei at the 2011 UCI Road World Championships.

Major results
2014
Taiwan Hsin-Chu Track International Classic
3rd Individual Pursuit
3rd Omnium

References

External links
 profile at Procyclingstats.com

1985 births
Taiwanese female cyclists
Living people
Place of birth missing (living people)
Date of birth missing (living people)